Friedrich Gustav Carl Emil Erlenmeyer (July 14, 1864 – February 8, 1921), also known as Emil Erlenmeyer, Jr., was a German chemist and the discoverer of the Erlenmeyer-Plöchl azlactone and amino acid synthesis. He was the son of Richard August Carl Emil Erlenmeyer and father of Hans Erlenmeyer.

Biography
Erlenmeyer was born in Heidelberg, but moved with his family to Munich in 1868.
He studied at various universities in Heidelberg, Bonn, Darmstadt and Marburg. He received his Ph.D. in 1888 from the University of Göttingen. 1893 he started working at the University of Strasbourg and from 1907 till his death in 1921 he was working at the kaiserliche biologische Anstallt Dahlem.

His son, Hans Erlenmeyer (1900–1967), worked also as chemist.

References

1864 births
1921 deaths
19th-century German chemists
20th-century German chemists
Academic staff of the University of Strasbourg